The 2021–22 season is the 21st season in the existence of S.V. Zulte Waregem and the club's 17th consecutive season in the top flight of Belgian football. In addition to the domestic league, S.V. Zulte Waregem will participate in this season's edition of the Belgian Cup.

Players

First-team squad

On loan

Transfers

Pre-season and friendlies

Competitions

Overall record

First Division A

League table

Results summary

Results by round

Matches
The league fixtures were announced on 8 June 2021.

Belgian Cup

References

S.V. Zulte Waregem seasons
Zulte Waregem